Stewarts Creek Township, North Carolina may refer to one of the following townships:

Stewarts Creek Township, Harnett County, North Carolina
Stewarts Creek Township, Surry County, North Carolina

See also

Stewart Township (disambiguation)

North Carolina township disambiguation pages